Gibberula hendricksae is a species of sea snail, a marine gastropod mollusk, in the family Cystiscidae. It is named after American opera singer Barbara Hendricks.

Description
The length of the shell attains 2.6 mm.

Distribution
This species occurs off Guadeloupe.

References

hendricksae
Gastropods described in 2015